The Prairie Conference was an IHSAA-sanctioned conference located in Northwest Indiana. The conference began in 1955 and lasted until 1968, when four of its member schools consolidated into Benton Central, which had formed just two years earlier from two other conference schools. The conference was primarily based in Benton County, with nearby schools in Jasper, Newton, Tippecanoe, and later White counties also participating.

Membership

References

Indiana high school athletic conferences
High school sports conferences and leagues in the United States
Indiana High School Athletic Association disestablished conferences